Deafheaven is an American post-metal band formed in 2010. Originally based in San Francisco, the group began as a two-piece with singer George Clarke and guitarist Kerry McCoy, who recorded and self-released a demo album together. Following its release, Deafheaven recruited three new members and began to tour. Before the end of 2010, the band signed to Deathwish Inc. and later released their debut album Roads to Judah, in April 2011. A follow-up album, Sunbather, was released in 2013 to wide critical acclaim, becoming one of the best reviewed albums of the year in the United States. In 2015 the band released their third album, New Bermuda, and in 2018 their fourth, Ordinary Corrupt Human Love. Their fifth studio album, Infinite Granite, was released in 2021.

Deafheaven has released five full-length albums, one solo extended play (EP), a split EP, two live albums, and ten singles (including two non-album singles).

Albums

Studio albums

Live albums

Extended plays

Singles

Videography

Music videos

Notes

References

External links
Deafheaven at Discogs

Heavy metal group discographies
Discographies of American artists